Li Qian (born 6 June 1990) is a Chinese boxer. She won the bronze medal in the women's middleweight class at the 2016 Summer Olympics, and a silver medal in the same event at the delayed 2020 Summer Olympics.

Career
Li was born in Henan. She and her parents moved to Ordos, Inner Mongolia in 2001. While studying at the Inner Mongolia Vocational College of Physical Education, she played basketball. Her height and arm length drew the attention of Chinese boxing team coach Ha Dabater, who recommended her for the Inner Mongolian boxing team in 2007. She won the bronze medal in the women's middleweight class at the 2016 Summer Olympics in Rio de Janeiro. She won a silver medal in the middleweight event at the delayed 2020 Summer Olympics, losing to Lauren Price in the final.

References

External links
 

1990 births
Living people
People from Ordos City
Sportspeople from Inner Mongolia
Sportspeople from Henan
Chinese women boxers
Olympic boxers of China
Boxers at the 2016 Summer Olympics
Place of birth missing (living people)
Olympic bronze medalists for China
Olympic medalists in boxing
Medalists at the 2016 Summer Olympics
AIBA Women's World Boxing Championships medalists
Asian Games silver medalists for China
Medalists at the 2014 Asian Games
Asian Games medalists in boxing
Boxers at the 2014 Asian Games
Middleweight boxers
Medalists at the 2020 Summer Olympics
Boxers at the 2020 Summer Olympics
Olympic silver medalists for China
21st-century Chinese women